Vadim Ivanovich Sushko (born 27 April 1986 in Navapolatsk, Byelorussian SSR, Soviet Union) is a Belarusian professional ice hockey defenceman. He currently plays for HC Vitebsk of the Belarusian Extraleague. During the 2008–09 season he also appeared for Dinamo Minsk of the Kontinental Hockey League.

References

External links

Championat profile

1986 births
Belarusian ice hockey defencemen
Living people
HC Shakhtyor Soligorsk players